Nicolae "Nae" Constantin (born 9 December 1973) is a Romanian football manager and former player. 

Mainly deployed as a centre-back, he spent most of his playing career at Petrolul Ploiești, Astra Ploiești, Rapid București and FC Brașov, among other brief stints. Although uncapped by the Romania national team, he was regarded as one of the best defenders of his generation.

Playing career
Constantin started his playing career with Victoria Florești, a local club in from his native Prahova County. After one season, he moved to Petrolul Ploiești. In spite of being a central defender, he would often go up front and score goals for his teams, as he proved so while on loan at Danubiana Ploiești, where he totalled six goals from 21 games. Upon his return to Petrolul, he managed seven goals in 69 matches, before moving to rival Rapid București in 1999. 

Constantin was loaned out during his first years in Bucharest to former clubs Danubiana—renamed Astra—and Petrolul, but became a notable figure in his later years at Rapid. Following Răzvan Lucescu's resignation at Rapid, he joined Cypriot side Digenis Akritas Morphou. Constantin only made seven appearances for Digenis, as he quickly returned to his home country to rejoin Lucescu and other Rapid players at FC Brașov. 

Reunited with his former coach and teammates, Constantin spent three seasons with "the Yellow-Blacks", before joining third division club Chimia Brazi in 2010. At the end of the season, Chimia missed out a promotion to the Liga II by only two points.

Managerial career
After retiring as a player, Constantin took up several positions as an assistant coach; notably, he collaborated with Răzvan Lucescu at Petrolul Ploiești in 2014 until the dismissal of the former, and between 2017 and 2019 assisted Daniel Isăilă during spells with the Romania under-21 national team and Saudi Arabian team Al-Hazem.

Constantin's first contracts as a head coach came in 2020 at Filiași and Comuna Recea, in the third and second divisions, respectively. In the summer of 2021, he returned to Petrolul as a head coach, which he stated it was one of his biggest wishes, and earned it promotion to the top flight after finishing the 2021–22 Liga II season in the first place.

Honours

Player
Rapid București
 Divizia A: 2002–03
 Cupa României: 2005–06
 Supercupa României: 1999, 2002, 2003

FC Brașov
Liga II: 2007–08

Coach
Petrolul Ploiești
Liga II: 2021–22

References

External links
 

1973 births
Living people
People from Prahova County
Romanian footballers
Association football defenders
Liga I players
Liga II players
Cypriot First Division players
FC Petrolul Ploiești players
FC Astra Giurgiu players
FC Rapid București players
Digenis Akritas Morphou FC players
FC Brașov (1936) players
Romanian expatriate footballers
Expatriate footballers in Cyprus
Romanian expatriate sportspeople in Cyprus
Romanian football managers
CS Academica Recea managers
FC Petrolul Ploiești managers
Liga I managers
Liga II managers